Boromys is an extinct genus of Cuban rodents in the family Echimyidae. 
It contains the following species:
 Oriente cave rat (Boromys offella)
 Torre's cave rat (Boromys torrei)

References

 
Prehistoric rodent genera
Holocene extinctions
Taxa named by Gerrit Smith Miller Jr.
Taxonomy articles created by Polbot